Travis Fimmel (born 15 July 1979) is an Australian actor and former model. He is known for his role as Ragnar Lothbrok in the History Channel television series Vikings (2013–2017), and as Anduin Lothar in the live-action adaptation of Warcraft (2016). He also starred in the HBO Max science fiction series Raised by Wolves (2020–2022).

Early life and modeling 
Fimmel was born near Echuca, Victoria, Australia. He was raised on a 5,500-acre dairy farm in Lockington. The youngest of three brothers, he is the son of Jennie, a recreation officer for the disabled, and Chris, a cattle farmer. Aspiring to be a professional Australian rules footballer, Fimmel moved to Melbourne to play for the St Kilda Football Club in the AFL, but a broken leg sidelined him before the season began. He was accepted into RMIT to study commercial architecture and engineering but later deferred to travel abroad.

Fimmel's modelling career began when he was spotted working out at a gym in the Melbourne suburb of Hawthorn by the flatmate of Matthew Anderson, a talent scout for the Chadwick Models agency.

Fimmel headed to the United States and was signed on the spot with agency LA Models in 2002 after walking into their office broke and barefoot. Cast by Jennifer Starr, he became the first male in the world to secure a six-figure deal to model exclusively for Calvin Klein for a year, and the last to be personally contracted by the brand's eponymous designer. He fronted CK's Crave men's fragrance campaign and modelled the brand's famous underwear. It was reported that one of his London billboards had to be pulled down after complaints from an auto club of traffic congestion and accidents by 'rubbernecking' female drivers, but Fimmel insisted the story started with a rumour spread on the internet.

He was named one of the world's sexiest bachelors by America's People magazine in 2002 and at the time was regarded as "the most in-demand male model in the world". It has been suggested by some journalists that Fimmel was the inspiration for Sex and the City heartthrob 'Jerry' Smith Jerrod.

Fimmel appeared on various magazine covers, including France's Numero Homme and America's TV Guide, turning down an offer from Australia's Seven Network to be a guest judge on the TV series Make Me A Supermodel.

Acting career 
Fimmel began his career by appearing in the music videos for Janet Jackson's song "Someone to Call My Lover"  and "I'm Real" (original version) by Jennifer Lopez (both 2001). He studied under Hollywood acting coach Ivana Chubbuck, taking two years to pluck up the courage to audition for his first role, saying "half of acting is overcoming your fears [and] letting yourself be vulnerable in front of people". He landed the title lead in The WB series Tarzan (2003), described by CNN as one of the "five hottest things happening in entertainment right now”, in which he did most of his own stunts. In addition, he appeared in two television pilots: The WB's drama Rocky Point with Lauren Holly in 2005, and the Fox crime thriller Southern Comfort with Madeleine Stowe in 2006.
 
Fimmel has played a diverse range of characters on the small and big screens. In 2008, he portrayed a murderer in Restraint and a party boy in Surfer, Dude with Matthew McConaughey and Woody Harrelson. In 2010, he portrayed a compassionate cowboy in Pure Country 2: The Gift and a forensic photographer in Australian horror film Needle, co-starring Ben Mendelsohn.

He depicted a talented classical pianist in Ivory, a "creative, edgy, out-of-the box" independent film that was an Official Selection in the 2010 Montreal World Film Festival and the Strasbourg International Film Festival. Produced by Academy Award-winner Gray Frederickson and co-starring Martin Landau and Peter Stormare, Ivory "details the troubled lives of classical pianists at a major American conservatory as they confront personal and professional rivalry during the rigors of training".

Fimmel played Helweg, a prison guard in the 2010 film The Experiment. It was reported that the role originally went to Elijah Wood, who pulled out of shooting for reasons unknown, so Fimmel instead took the job. The film is based on a real-life experiment on volunteers by Stanford University that was cut short after spinning out of control, with 'guards' exhibiting sadistic behaviour and 'prisoners' suffering depression.

Fimmel starred opposite Patrick Swayze in A&E's 2009 series The Beast. He played rookie undercover FBI agent Ellis Dove partnered with a hardened veteran cop, Swayze's Charles Barker. Production ceased after 13 episodes due to Swayze's death from pancreatic cancer.

He played fugitive Mason Boyle in two episodes of NBC's 2010 action-adventure Chase (season 1, episodes 1 and 8), produced by Jerry Bruckheimer.

Fimmel appeared in FX's TV pilot Outlaw Country in 2011 with Luke Grimes, described as a "modern drama set against the back drop of a southern organized crime family". According to Variety magazine, he plays a rugged, "hard-drinking gang member and the main character's best friend".

He co-starred with Billy Bob Thornton and Eva Longoria in the 2013 redneck Southern comedy flick The Baytown Outlaws, playing one of the three hapless Oodie brothers who bites off more than he can chew when he agrees to help a woman get her godson back from her deadbeat ex-husband.

Fimmel played the lead in 2012's Harodim, originally titled The Lazarus Protocol, with Peter Fonda as a former intelligence officer trained in black ops tracking down the world's most wanted terrorist who is compromised by his own chain of command.

Fimmel was signed as the lead character for four seasons in the drama television series Vikings, co-starring Alexander Ludwig, Katheryn Winnick, Gabriel Byrne and Linus Roache. Premiering in 2013, the show chronicles "the extraordinary and ferocious world of the mighty Norsemen who raided, traded and explored during The Middle Ages." He played a character loosely based on Ragnar Loðbrók, the legendary Viking leader who is frustrated by the unadventurous tendencies of his local chieftain and strikes out to pillage new lands. USA Today described Fimmel's performance as "engaging", while The Huffington Post called it his "breakout role".

Fimmel starred as military commander Anduin Lothar in Warcraft (2016), a live-action film adaptation of the Warcraft video game franchise. It was reported that a horse spooked by a wind fan collapsed on Fimmel while performing one of his own stunts but he emerged unscathed.

He was cast as a quirky hipster in romantic comedy Maggie's Plan with Ethan Hawke and Julianne Moore, and a loving but irresponsible father in Lean on Pete with Charlie Plummer and Steve Buscemi.

Named as the Actor of the Year in GQ Australias 2017 Men of the Year Awards, Fimmel told the audience in his characteristic self-deprecating style, "I'm not sure how I got this, but I demand a recount".

In February 2018, Fimmel was announced as the lead actor in the upcoming film Danger Close: The Battle of Long Tan, playing the role of Major Harry Smith who led soldiers under his command against the Viet Cong during the Battle of Long Tan in the Vietnam War. It is based on the historic account of 105 Australian soldiers and 3 New Zealand soldiers who defeated an estimated 2,000 North Vietnamese soldiers in a rubber plantation near Nui Dat on 17 August 1966.

He co-stars opposite fellow Australian Margot Robbie in the indie film Dreamland. Set in the 1930s Dust Bowl, the story follows a teenage boy on his quest to beat out the FBI to capture a fugitive bank robber in order to claim a bounty and save the family farm. His next film was El Tonto, a comedy written, directed by and starring Charlie Day.

In 2020, he appeared in HBO Max's science fiction drama Raised by Wolves from director Ridley Scott and Scott Free Productions.

Personal life 
Fimmel's favourite recreational activities include Australian rules football, fishing, camping, horse riding, surfing, riding motorbikes and going to the beach.

Fimmel also played a celebrity cricket match in the 2009 Australia vs England Hollywood Ashes with fellow Australian actors Jesse Spencer from House, Cameron Daddo, celebrity chef Curtis Stone, INXS bass guitarist Garry Gary Beers and cricket fast bowler Michael Kasprowicz. 

Fimmel is an atheist.

Filmography

Film

Television

Awards and nominations

See also
 List of male underwear models

References

External links 

 
 Travis Fimmel's pics and bio in hola.com

1979 births
Living people
Australian expatriates in the United States
Australian expatriates in England
Australian male film actors
Australian male models
Australian rules footballers from Victoria (Australia)
Australian male television actors
People from Victoria (Australia)
People from Echuca
21st-century Australian male actors
Australian atheists